The Constitution Alteration (Trusts) Bill 1912, was an unsuccessful referendum held in 1913 that sought to alter the Australian Constitution to give the Commonwealth legislative power in respect to trusts.

Question
Do you approve of the proposed law for the alteration of the Constitution entitled 'Constitution Alteration (Trusts) 1912'?

The proposal was to alter the text of section 51 of the Constitution to read as follows:
51. The Parliament shall, subject to this Constitution, have Legislative power to make laws for the peace, order, and good government of the Commonwealth with respect to:
(xl.) Trusts, combinations, and monopolies in relation to the production, manufacture, or supply of goods, or the supply of services.

Results
The referendum was not approved by a majority of voters, and a majority of the voters was achieved in only three states.

Discussion
The 1911 referendum asked a single question that dealt with the acquisition of monopolies.  This resolution separated laws in relation to monopolies and the acquisition of monopolies into different questions. Like its forebear, neither resolution was carried. On each of the many occasions a similar question was asked at a referendum the public decided not to vest power in the Commonwealth over these matters.

1911 referendum on monopolies

See also
Politics of Australia
History of Australia

References

Further reading
 Standing Committee on Legislative and Constitutional Affairs (1997) Constitutional Change: Select sources on Constitutional change in Australia 1901–1997. Australian Government Printing Service, Canberra.
 Bennett, Scott (2003). Research Paper no. 11 2002–03: The Politics of Constitutional Amendment Australian Department of the Parliamentary Library, Canberra.
 Australian Electoral Commission (2007) Referendum Dates and Results 1906 – Present AEC, Canberra.

Referendum (Trusts)
1913 referendums
1913 (Trusts)